is a fictional character and a major antagonist of the manga series Jujutsu Kaisen created by Gege Akutami. A cursed spirit born out of the negative emotions flowing from humans, he was once known as the King of Curses over a thousand years ago, the undisputed most powerful cursed spirit of all time. Believed to always have been a curse, he was in fact a human sorcerer before being sealed and incarnating as a cursed spirit, wherein his immense power was so strong that he had to be contained within 20 fingers. At the beginning of the story, Yuji Itadori ate one of his fingers, becoming his vessel and bringing Sukuna back to life.

In the anime adaptation, he is voiced by Junichi Suwabe in Japanese and Ray Chase in English. Sukuna's sadistic and "terrifying" demeanor as the series' villain was praised, along with the dual nature of his relationship with Yuji.

Concept and creation 
According to Akutami, Sukuna is "less of a sorcerer and more of a walking disaster." Sukuna was created as a cruel, narcissistic, depraved and supremely arrogant figure within the story. The real person turned mythological figure "Ryomen Sukuna," who was the character's inspiration, traces back to the classical Japanese book Nihon Shoki, where Sukuna's fantasized physical figure (two faces and four arms) and malicious demonic personality are shared with the character. In ancient history, Sukuna was an enemy to the Yamato family but was also worshiped by some as a deity, though his association with demonic imagery was formed after the Imperial House of Japan declared him a vicious force of nature. His given name, Ryomen, means "two-faced," which can be applied to the character both literally and figuratively. Sukuna did not ever have a wife or family in his life as a human, and that he was feared as a human less than Satoru Gojo due to how vicious the world of curses was at the time he lived. Furthermore, Gege stated Sukuna "will kill anybody in an instant" and that he has no morals, taking pleasure out of making things tough for Yuji.

According to his English voice, Ray Chase, his favorite aspect of the character was his relationship with Yuji sharing the same body, saying that "Sukuna has such a different view of pain, power, life, than Itadori, as he has existed for more than one thousand years. It’s a kind of maturity that allows the villain to mistreat the hero in so many ways." Chase hoped that Sukuna could defeat Gojo so that Yuji could gain the power to defeat Sukuna in his "mind palace." In another interview, Chase said that he took inspiration from the Japanese dub to differentiate between Sukuna and Yuji as they share a body. Chase said that " it’s fun to have lots of asides about how pathetic Itadori is under your breath!  I’d say ultimately it falls on the show being well written and paced which makes Sukuna especially fun whenever he shows up." In forming a voice for Sukuna, Chase felt that he had to do "a weird and interesting voice for him [that is] not very anime at all, and definitely not one that I’ve used before. He’s got a timelessness to him which helps as he’s a thousand years old, but also with kind of a New York attitude for his more disdainful moments."

Appearances 
Many years ago, Sukuna was a human. He had an underling, Uraume, who served him at the time. At the beginning of the story, he is sealed in 20 wax fingers scattered throughout the world. Megumi Fushiguro traced one of his fingers to Sugisawa High School, and was taken by the Occult Club. In the chaos that followed, Yuji ate the finger and began his journey as a jujutsu sorcerer.

Though Yuji was able to exhibit great control over his body, he struggled to contain Sukuna on several occasions. At a detention center, Sukuna took over Yuji's body  to fight a special grade cursed spirit, but refused to give it back. After fighting Megumi, he rips out Yuji's heart, killing his host, though Yuji ends up surviving and fights Sukuna within his territory. Sukuna laughed with Mahito, a cursed spirit, after Yuji's friend Junpei was killed. After Mahito attempted to transfigure Yuji, Sukuna summoned Mahito to his domain and warned him to never touch his soul again.

In the Shibuya incident, the number of fingers Yuji has eaten has gone up to 15 fingers. Sukuna once again awakens in Yuji's body after being force-fed 10 fingers at once. He challenged Jogo, another cursed spirit, to a fight and beat him with a fire-based curse technique but destroyed much of Shibuya as a result. He also consulted with Uraume during the battle, stating that he was about to be fully freed. He then defeated Mahoraga, an extremely powerful shikigami, saving Megumi. Finally, he surrendered control back to Yuji and let him take a look at the decimated Shibuya ward.

Reception 
Sukuna's arrogance and "almost casual display of handling immense cursed energy" was praised by Sportskeeda, also calling him "awe-inspiring and terrifying" as well as "the ultimate anime villain," labeling him as one of the most beloved shonen villains. Chingy Nea of Polygon praised the way Sukuna was a "cruel and emotionless sadist" and how he helped the anime "feign predictability" by having him kill Yuji early on in the story. Sukuna's awakening in Yuji's body was described "disgusting and fantastic." David Eckstein-Schoemann of the UNF Spinnaker praised the duality between main character and protagonist. He said that "you think of all the possibilities...and they take full advantage of that. The conflict and interactions between Yuji and Sukuna are both creative and brilliant. It plays a lot with your expectations." The character and Chase's performance in the dub was praised: "[he] lights up the screen as a newly incarnated cursed spirit, Ryomen Sukuna, as an elated insatiable animal that takes pleasure in grazing on the fear and flesh of humans and fills Fushiguro with a sense of dread of what’s to come." The character was also compared to Bleachs protagonist Ichigo Kurosaki and his Hollow persona due their parallels especially in the his early appearances; such being young fighters who develop supernatural powers as well as evil alter-egos in order to protect people from giant monsters. Comic Book Resources compared Itadori's temptation to use Sukuna as temptation similar to other shōnen heroes such Ichigo's Hollow persona as analysis of how everybody has inner conflicts.

In a Viz Media popularity poll conducted in March 2021, Sukuna was voted as the ninth most popular character in the series. In a second poll taken in December 2021 by Shonen Jump, he was voted the 13th most popular character.

References 

Anime and manga characters who can move at superhuman speeds
Anime and manga characters who use magic
Anime and manga characters with accelerated healing
Anime and manga characters with superhuman strength
Anime and manga supervillains
Comics characters introduced in 2018
Fictional characters with energy-manipulation abilities
Fictional characters with fire or heat abilities
Fictional characters with spirit possession or body swapping abilities
Fictional characters with superhuman durability or invulnerability
Fictional demons and devils
Fictional Japanese people in anime and manga
Fictional male martial artists
Fictional yōkai
Male characters in anime and manga
Martial artist characters in anime and manga
Villains in animated television series